Amelioration may refer to:

 Amelioration patterns, a software design pattern
 Amelioration Act 1798, a statute in the Leeward Islands regarding the treatment of slaves
 Rapid climatic amelioration, in geology, a major change from glacial to interglacial stages, specifically regarding transitions in the oxygen isotope ratio cycle
 Land improvement, alternatively called amelioration)
 The process by which the pejorative associations of a word are swept away; see Pejorative#Pejoration and melioration